France Info is a radio network operated by the French public service radio broadcaster Radio France. It provides continuous live news and information.

Broadcasting on FM (as well as being streamed on the internet), France Info is receivable across France and audible too in the border regions of neighbouring countries, including southern parts of the United Kingdom, especially the southeastern coastal region of England.

History 
France Info was founded in 1987 by Roland Faure and Jérôme Bellay. Year on year its audience has grown, notably after the social conflicts of 1995, 2003, and 2006. It is frequently estimated to be the fourth largest French radio network in terms of listener numbers, after RTL, NRJ and France Inter.

France Info has offices in Paris, Lyon, Marseille, and Toulouse, and also makes use of local-news input from the France Bleu network.

Journalists and presenters

David Abiker
Sophie Auvigne
Matthieu Beauval
Gilbert Chevalier
Jérôme Colombain
Olivier de Lagarde
Raphaëlle Duchemin
Olivier Émond
Jean-Pierre Gauffre
Anne-Élisabeth Lemoine
Chloé Leprince
Jean Leymarie (journalist)
Marie-Ève Malouines
Marie-Odile Monchicourt
Benjamin Muller
Grégory Philipps
Richard Place
Catherine Pottier
Bernard Thomasson
Philippe Vandel

Frequencies

FM 
Main transmitters:

Bar-le-Duc (Willeroncourt) 104.5 MHz
Bastia (Serra di Pigno) 105.5 MHz
Bayonne (La Rhune) 105.5 MHz
Charleville-Mézières (Sury) 105.9 MHz
Clermont-Ferrand (Puy-de-Dôme) 105.5 MHz
Le Mans (Mayet) 105.5 MHz
Lille (Bouvigny le Mont) 105.2 MHz
Lyon (Mont Pilat) 103.4 MHz
Marseille (Petite Étoile) 105.3 MHz
Metz (Luttange) 106.8 MHz
Mulhouse (Belvédère) 105.5 MHz
Nice (Mont Chauve) 105.7 MHz
Paris (Tour Eiffel) 105.5 MHz
Perpignan (Pic de Neulos) 105.1 MHz
Reims (TDF Hautvillers) 105.5 MHz
Strasbourg (TDF Nordheim) 104.4 MHz
Vannes (Moustoir-Ac) 105.5 MHz

Former mediumwave frequencies 
These frequencies were de-activated at midnight local time on the night of 31 December 2015, except for Lyon and Rennes: Rennes transmitter continued to broadcast until 2 January 2016 0900 UTC, while Lyon continued to broadcast until midnight on 4 January 2016, for the Holy Mass for the sick held by Notre Dame des Ondes on Sunday 3 January.

 	
 Bayonne (Camps de Prats) 1494 kHz ; Power : 4 kW
 Lyon (Tramoyes) 603 kHz ; Power : 300 kW
 Bordeaux (Néac) 1206 kHz ; Power : 100 kW
 Brest (Quimerc'h) 1404 kHz ; Power : 20 kW
 Clermont-Ferrand (Ennezat) 1494 kHz ; Power : 20 kW
 Dijon (Couternon) 1404 kHz ; Power : 5 kW
 Lille (Camphin-en-Carembault) 1377 kHz ; Power : 300 kW
 Marseille (Réaltor) 1242 kHz ; Power : 150 kW
 Nice (Fontbonne) 1557 kHz ; Power : 150 kW
 Rennes (Thourie) 711 kHz ;  Power : 300 kW

Logos and symbols

References

External links 
 France info transmitters map 
 France Info 
 France Info live streaming in mp3 

Radio France
Radio stations established in 1987